Daimon is both a Japanese surname and a given name. Notable people with the name include:

 Daimon Shelton (born 1972), professional American football player
, Japanese politician

Fictional characters:
 Daimon, antagonist in the Dark-Hunter book series
, series of antagonists in the Sailor Moon metaseries
 Daimon (Star Trek), Ferengi rank in the Star Trek universe
 Daimon Hellstrom, character in the Marvel Comics universe
, character in The King of Fighters series of fighting games
, character in Tokusou Exceedraft
, character in Danganronpa Another Episode: Ultra Despair Girls
, character in Digimon Data Squad
 Daimon Tatsumi, character in Kyukyu Sentai GoGoV
, character in Doctor-X

Japanese-language surnames